This is the discography of British singer Bernard Jewry, better known as Alvin Stardust, including the discography of Shane Fenton and the Fentones, of which he was the lead singer.

As Shane Fenton, Jewry released eight singles with the Fentones and four solo singles (one of which was under another alias 'Jo-Jo Ellis'). The Fentones also released two instrumental singles which have been included here. No studio albums were released by the group, but one EP and two compilation albums have been released since they split.

As Alvin Stardust, he released thirty-five singles, one EP, eleven studio albums (two posthumously and three which were re-recordings of his hits) and two live albums. At least ten compilation albums have been released comprising Stardust's songs.

Albums

Studio albums

Live albums

Compilation albums

EPs

Singles

Notes

References

Discographies of British artists
Pop music discographies
Rock music discographies